Fatouville-Grestain is a commune in the Eure department in the Normandy region in northern France.

Population

See also
Communes of the Eure department
 Article on the medieval entrance towers to La Pommeraye at Grestain, with images

References

Communes of Eure